Rajya Sabha elections were held on various dates in 1955, to elect members of the Rajya Sabha, Indian Parliament's upper chamber.

Elections
Elections were held to elect members from various states.

Members elected
The following members are elected in the elections held in 1955. They are members for the term 1955-1961 and retire in year 1961, except in case of the resignation or death before the term.
The list is incomplete.

State - Member - Party

Bye-elections
The following bye elections were held in the year 1955.

State - Member - Party

 Andhra - T J M Wilson - INC ( ele   07/07/1955 term till 1958 )
 Delhi -  Mehr Chand Khanna - INC ( ele   13/05/1955 term till 1958 )res 14/12/1956
 Uttar Pradesh  - Govind Ballabh Pant - INC  ( ele  02/03/1955 term till 1958 )

References

1955 elections in India
1955